Motive Studio (also known as EA Motive and Motive) is a Canadian video game developer and studio of Electronic Arts (EA) based in Montreal.

History 
Motive Studio was founded within Electronic Arts (EA) by Jade Raymond, a former Ubisoft executive and producer, at the helm. Her appointment was announced on 13 July 2015. Motive focuses on action-adventure games and creating new intellectual properties.

Kim Swift was hired as Motive's design director in January 2017. The Montreal studio of BioWare, another EA developer, was merged into Motive in August 2017. A Vancouver branch for Motive was announced in June 2018. Following Raymond's departure in 2018, Patrick Klaus, a former managing director for Ubisoft Quebec, was hired by EA as senior vice-president and Motive's general manager.

While Motive had been working on Star Wars titles from the formation of the studio, the studio also had a second project under the working name Gaia that it had been developing. Motive nor EA had said much of this game outside of a 2020 promotional video showing a few seconds of footage from it, and calling it "a highly ambitious, innovative new game that puts the power and creativity in your hands". According to Bloomberg News, while part of Motive was working on Star Wars Battlefront II, the other portion was working on Gaia; once Battlefront II had shipped, its team was absorbed into the Gaia team by 2018 and caused some cultural clashes within the studio, causing some of the studio executives to leave, followed by Raymond later that year. Gaia had to be rebooted following these departures, extending its development time. Further, according to Bloomberg, as a result of a review of its current slate of projects in February 2021, EA cancelled the development of Gaia, though Motive will continue on with other projects.

Venture Beat reported that Motive was working on a revival of the Dead Space series starting with a remake of the first game, in the same vein as the Resident Evil 2 remake''.

In September 2022, EA announced that Motive is working on an action-adventure Iron Man game with Marvel Games.

Games developed

References

External links 
 

2015 establishments in Quebec
Companies based in Montreal
Electronic Arts
Canadian companies established in 2015
Video game companies established in 2015
Video game companies of Canada
Video game development companies
Canadian subsidiaries of foreign companies